was a Japanese samurai commander in the Genpei War, the great conflict between the Minamoto and Taira clans.

An infant at the time of the Heiji Rebellion (1159–1160), Takatsuna was spared the destruction of his family several years later. He grew up with an aunt in Kyoto, and joined the forces of Minamoto no Yoritomo in 1180, when Yoritomo called for aid against the Taira.

Takatsuna saved Yoritomo's life at the battle of Ishibashiyama, and aided in the destruction of the Taira following the end of the war. As a result, he was rewarded with the position of shugo or governor of Nagato province.

In 1195, Takatsuna retired to Mount Koya to become a Shingon priest.  He left his son with his title, land, and all his material possessions. He is said to have died in 1214 in Matsumoto, Nagano (then Shinano Province). Nogi Maresuke was one of his descendants.

When depicted in tales or in art, Takatsuna is often shown racing Kajiwara Kagesue across the River Uji atop Shōgun Yoritomo's white horse, Ikezuki, to be the first to engage in battle at the 1184 battle of Uji.

See also 
 Sasaki clan
 The Tale of the Heike
 Sasaki Yoshikiyo

Notes

References
 Kitagawa, Hiroshi and Burce T. Tsuchida, ed. (1975). The Tale of the Heike. Tokyo: University of Tokyo Press.  OCLC 164803926
 Nussbaum, Louis Frédéric and Käthe Roth. (2005). Japan Encyclopedia. Cambridge: Harvard University Press. ; OCLC 48943301
Sasaki Takatsuna. (1985). Kodansha Encyclopedia of Japan. Tokyo: Kodansha Ltd.
 Varley, Paul. (1994). Warriors of Japan as Portrayed in the War Tales. Honolulu: University of Hawaii Press. ; ; 

1160 births
1214 deaths
Samurai